Francisville may refer to:

Francisville, Kentucky
Francisville, Georgia
Francisville, Philadelphia

See also
Francesville, Indiana